A superphone is a smartphone with high-end features that distinguish it from basic (low-end) smartphones.

Functionality 
It implies high-end functionality beyond the basic criteria for a smartphone, such as the ability to be more tailored to a specific user's needs. A Superphone usually incorporates state of the art technology, innovations in hardware, and newer refined software. For example, having the latest SoC chip made from OEMs such as Qualcomm or Intel. A superphone could also imply a certain set of physical characteristics that is unique, unusual, innovative, and not regularly seen in smartphones; an example of this are the edge-to-edge "bezel-less" displays found in higher-end smartphones such as the Samsung Galaxy S8 or the Essential Phone.

Examples 
An appropriate example of a Superphone is the LG G Flex 2.  The body is curved horizontally, making it less likely to break when bent, for example when one sits on the phone by accident.  The back of the G Flex 2 is coated with a material that 'self-heals' within minutes when scratched. The Moto Z can also be considered an example of a Superphone for its innovative "Moto Mods", a set of individual modules which can be magnetically attached on the back to greatly extend the functionality of the phone.

Many flagship smartphones from various OEMs (Samsung, LG, HTC) can be considered to be Superphones, as the term flagship refers to the OEMs most high-end offering. Both terms can be used simultaneously to convey the same meaning.

Criteria 
Plausible criteria for Superphones in 2017 include:
 Minimum of 1080p (Full-HD) display, 1440p (Quad-HD) displays are preferable. 4K-screens are anticipated.
 Screen display larger than 5-inches (125 mm) (may overlap with phablet).
 Screen display features minimal bezels, adopting the 'bezel-less' form factor
 USB-C port, instead of the older Micro-USB 2.0
 The addition of a fingerprint or iris scanner for extra security
 Hardware is built out of high-end durable materials
 A dual camera system, either for increasing the field of view, the optical zoom, and/or to enhance the color reproduction of the image
 Supports NFC.
 Supports Qi Wireless Charging.
 Supports Quick Charging.
 Ability to replace system software and user-interface of the phone using 3rd party software.
 Ability to add certain modules to extend the functionality of the phone
 Multi-core processor and dedicated 3D-graphics, minimum of 1.5 GHz.
 At least 4GB of RAM.
 Large capacity battery, larger than 3000mAh.
 High-speed internet 100Mbit/s WWAN capabilities or higher.
 Has Hi-Fi audio capabilities built into the phone.

References

External links 
  Wired magazine 2010-01-05
  cnet article 2010-06-12
  techradar article 2012-01-18
  mashable 2013-08-08
  wiktionary def.
  Collins dictionary.
  Superphone, Bell definition
  Definition of a flagship phone
  LG G Flex 2

Smartphones
Samsung Galaxy
Qualcomm